Ovacık is a village in the Başmakçı District, Afyonkarahisar Province, Turkey. Its population is 290 (2021). It is located southeast of the district capital of Başmakçı and east of Yassıören.

References

Villages in Başmakçı District